Independent Fabrication (IF) is a bicycle company located in Lynn, Massachusetts, USA. IF fabricates bicycle frames from steel, titanium and carbon fiber. Independent Fabrication has twice won the Bicycling Magazine "Dream Bike of the Year" with its carbon-tubed, titanium-lugged XS road frame. Independent Fabrication was founded by and is owned by its employees. In 2005, the company took part in a CNN television program called The TurnAround. The show paired a growing business with a mentor from a more successful company. Independent Fabrication was paired with Jeff Swartz, chief executive of Timberland.

In 2011, the company announced that its factory would move from Somerville, Massachusetts, to Newmarket, New Hampshire, within the year. A handful of IF's employees made the move with the company, and several former employees returned.

In 2022 Independent Fabrication was purchased by longtime employee Keith Rouse. He moved the company back to Massachusetts, not far from their Somerville location.

History of Independent Fabrication
Independent Fabrication was formed by former employees of Fat City Cycles and later Merlin Metalworks. Giana Roberge won the 2004 world masters time-trial championship in Austria on an XS.

In 2007 Gary Smith bought 80% of the company, with the employees owning the remaining 20%.

Bicycle Frames
Independent Fabrication currently manufactures the following custom bicycle frame models:

Road
Corvid (Carbon)
XS (Carbon and Titanium)
Factory Lightweight (Steel)
Factory Lightweight (Ti/Carbon)
Crown Jewel (Steel; Steel Special Edition (SE); Steel Special Edition Carbon (SEC); Titanium; and Titanium SEC)
SSR (Columbus XCR Stainless Steel; SSR SEC)
Club Racer (Steel or Titanium)

Note SEC features carbon wishbone seat stays.

Cyclocross
Corvid Cross (Carbon Fiber)
Planet Cross (Steel or Titanium)
SSX (Columbus XCR Stainless Steel)

Off Road
Deluxe (Steel or Titanium)
Beatstick (Steel)

Touring
Independence (Steel or Titanium)

Specials
Independent Fabrication has also produced specials and one-off bikes. Some are show bikes, others have been built to the requirements of customers or other companies: 
BMXS
XS version of the Planet Cross cyclocross bike.
Phil Wood Piss Off (which had a limited production run)
Tungsten Electrode full suspension (prototyped in steel and titanium)
Various Dual Slalom/4X frames.

Owners' Club
An Independent Fabrication Owners' Club launched in 2004. It has a register of over 1,750 IF bikes.

Grassroots Racing
Independent Fabrication has a small but successful grassroots racing program. Racers past and present include:
Tiffany Mann
Maureen Bruno Roy
Brian Keich
Eric Roman

Darren Ling

Dave Bradley

Harlan Price

Mike Ramponi Sr.

They also sponsored a regional woman’s team called the IF Chicks.  The roster included Lauri Webber from NewArk, DE and Kerry Combs from Mass.

IF Racing
IF Racing was formed in February 2008 by team director Jonathan Bruno. The squad is a newly expanded U25 Development program for road racing and pro mountain bike racing. In addition to efforts to promote environmental sustainability and healthy choices, the team will participate in an after-school cycling program for Boston public schools.

 Team Website: https://sites.google.com/site/ifracing/
2010 Team
Jonathan Bruno
Evan Cooper
Robbie King
John Hanson
Emerson Oronte
Matt Buckley
Vinnie Scalia
Kevin Wolfson
Todd Yezefski

Women's team
The team, which started as Merlin/Smartfuel in 1997 and in 2000 picked up sponsorship from Independent Fabrication, is based in New England and rides regional and National Racing Calendar events.

Current Riders:
Brenda Bahnson
Pauline Frascone
Zoe Sheehan
Michele Smith
Silke Wunderwald

Former Riders:
Katrina Davis
Kirsten Grasshoff
Katheryn Curi Mattis
Lisa Maxwell
Julia Oh
Heather Peck
Jessica Phillips
Kathryn Roszko
Marianne Stover
Sarah Uhl
Aimee Vasse

Gallery

External links
 Independent Fabrication
 Independent Fabrication Owners' Club
 Independent Fabrication Racing Team 
  Independent Fabrication Racing Team

References

Cycle manufacturers of the United States
Manufacturing companies based in New Hampshire
Mountain bike manufacturers
Manufacturing companies established in 1995
Bicycle framebuilders
1995 establishments in Massachusetts
American companies established in 1995